Achalinus hainanus, also known as the Hainan odd-scaled snake, is a species of snake in the family Xenodermatidae. It is endemic to the island of Hainan in China.

References

Xenodermidae
Snakes of China
Endemic fauna of Hainan
Reptiles described in 1975
IUCN Red List vulnerable species